Elections to the South Dakota House of Representatives were held on November 3, 2020, as a part of the biennial elections in the U.S. state of South Dakota. All 70 seats were up for re-election. Each of the 70 seats are subdivided in two single-member districts.

Primary elections were held on June 2, 2020.

Predictions

Results

District 1

District 2

District 3

District 4

District 5

District 6

District 7

District 8

District 9

District 10

District 11

District 12

District 13

District 14

District 15

District 16

District 17

District 18

District 19

District 20

District 21

District 22

District 23

District 24

District 25

District 26A

District 26B

District 27

District 28A

District 28B

District 29

District 30

District 31

District 32

District 33

District 34

District 35

References 

South Dakota House
2020
House